Colin Frank Davies (born 12 April 1936) is an English former footballer who played at centre-half for Port Vale and Stourbridge.

Career
Davies joined Port Vale as an amateur in May 1958 and signed as a professional in June 1959. After making his debut at Vale Park in a goalless draw with Queen's Park Rangers on 19 March 1960, he played in the nine remaining Third Division games of the season. However, Peter Ford had already established himself in the centre of midfield and retained his place the next season, at the expense of Davies. Ford only missed five games of that season and Davies filled in for three of these. Davies was given a free transfer by "Valiants" manager Norman Low in May 1961 and moved on to Stourbridge.

Career statistics
Source:

References

Sportspeople from Shrewsbury
English footballers
Association football midfielders
Port Vale F.C. players
Stourbridge F.C. players
English Football League players
1936 births
Living people